Rashad Greene Sr. (born September 23, 1992) is a former American football wide receiver. He played college football at Florida State, and was drafted by the Jacksonville Jaguars in the fifth round of the 2015 NFL Draft.

Early years
Greene attended Westover Comprehensive High School from 2007 to 2009, where he played football and was a standout at wide receiver. Greene was a standout track & field athlete in sprints and relays at Westover. He recorded a personal-best time of 48.27 seconds in the 400 meters at the 2009 GA State 3A Class on his way to a third-place finish. At the 2009 Westover Relays, he took gold in the 400 meters, at 49.07 seconds, and placed fourth in the 200 meters with a time of 22.07 seconds. Greene also ran the third-leg on the 4 × 100 m relay squad, helping them capture the state championship at 41.60 seconds.

After his sophomore year, Greene transferred to St. Thomas Aquinas High School in Fort Lauderdale, Florida. As a senior, Greene had 43 receptions for 943 yards (21.9 yards per catch) with 13 touchdowns. In the 2010 Class 5A State title game against Tampa's Plant High School, he recorded six receptions for 148 yards and two touchdowns, including a title-clinching 74-yard pass in the fourth quarter.

Considered a four-star recruit by Rivals.com, he was rated as the 29th best wide receiver prospect of his class.

College career
Greene enrolled at Florida State University in the fall of 2011 under head coach Jimbo Fisher. As a freshman in 2011, Greene made 38 receptions for 596 yards and seven touchdowns. He was the MVP of the 2011 Champs Sports Bowl in an 18–14 victory over Notre Dame. As a sophomore in 2012, he had 57 receptions for 741 yards and six touchdowns.

As a junior in 2013, Greene led the Seminoles with 76 receptions for 1,128 yards and nine touchdowns, including nine receptions for 147 yards in the 2014 BCS National Championship Game against Auburn. As a senior in 2014, Greene set the school record for career receptions and receiving yards, passing Ron Sellers in both categories. He also set the record for receptions in a season with 99. He also had 1,365 receiving yards and seven touchdowns in 2014. For his career, Greene had 270 receptions for 3,830 yards and 29 touchdowns.

Collegiate statistics

Professional career

Jacksonville Jaguars
Greene was drafted 139th overall in the fifth round of the 2015 NFL Draft by the Jacksonville Jaguars. He was the eighth of 11 Florida State Seminoles to be selected in the draft that year. On September 13, 2015, Greene scored his first professional touchdown on a one-yard reception from Blake Bortles in the season opener against the Carolina Panthers. Later in the season, on December 13, 2015, Greene returned a punt 73 yards for a touchdown against the Indianapolis Colts. Overall, he finished his rookie season with 19 receptions for 93 receiving yards and two receiving touchdowns to go along with his one punt return touchdown.

In 2016, Greene appeared in eight games for the Jaguars and recorded five receptions for 32 yards, and lost one fumble. He also contributed 131 punt return yards before going down with an Achilles injury. He was placed on injured reserve on December 3, 2016.

On September 2, 2017, the Jaguars placed Greene on injured reserve.

On September 15, 2018, Greene was released by the Jaguars, but was re-signed two days later. In Week 11 against Indianapolis, with 1:35 left in the game and the Jaguars trailing by three, Greene fumbled his only catch of the game (and only his third of the season), leading to a loss.

Saskatchewan Roughriders
In February 2020, Greene signed with the Saskatchewan Roughriders of the Canadian Football League. The team announced his retirement on April 9, 2021.

Personal life
Greene has three sons, Rashad Jr., born in 2014, Rylan born in 2018, and Roman born in 2020.

References

External links
Florida State Seminoles bio
Jacksonville Jaguars bio

Living people
1992 births
Sportspeople from Albany, Georgia
Players of American football from Georgia (U.S. state)
American football return specialists
American football wide receivers
Florida State Seminoles football players
Jacksonville Jaguars players
Saskatchewan Roughriders players
St. Thomas Aquinas High School (Florida) alumni